Scranton is a city in Pennsylvania, United States.

Scranton may also refer to:

Places

United States
 Lake Scranton, a reservoir next to Scranton, Pennsylvania
 Scranton, Arkansas, a city
 Scranton, Iowa, a city
 Scranton, Kansas, a city
 Scranton, Kentucky, an unincorporated community
 Scranton, Mississippi, a former city merged with Pascagoula, Mississippi
 Scranton, North Dakota, a city
 Scranton, South Carolina, a town
 Scranton, New York, an unincorporated hamlet
 Scranton, Utah, a ghost town

People
 Deborah Scranton, American documentarian
 George W. Scranton (1811–1861), American iron tycoon and U.S. Representative for Pennsylvania
 Jim Scranton (born 1960), American former professional baseball player
 Joseph A. Scranton (1838–1908), U.S. Representative for Pennsylvania
 Mary Scranton (1918–2015), former First Lady of Pennsylvania
 Mary F. Scranton (1832–1909), Methodist Episcopal Church missionary, the first female missionary in Korea, and the founder of the Ewha Girls School there
 Nancy Scranton (born 1961), American professional golfer
 Paul Scranton (born 1944), American professional basketball player for the ABA's Anaheim Amigos
 William Scranton (1917–2013), former Pennsylvania Governor and 1964 US Presidential candidate
 William B. Scranton (1856-1922), Methodist Episcopal Church missionary to Korea, son of Mary F. Scranton
 William Scranton, III (born 1947), former Pennsylvania Lieutenant Governor, son of William Scranton
 William Walker Scranton (1844–1916), Pennsylvania businessman

Other uses
 The University of Scranton, a Jesuit university located in Scranton, Pennsylvania
 , four ships of the United States Navy
 The Scranton Declaration, an important document in the development of craft unionism
 Roman Catholic Diocese of Scranton, an organizational division of the Catholic Church centered in Scranton, Pennsylvania
 Scranton (NJT station), the proposed terminus for New Jersey Transit passenger rail service from New York City and Hoboken to Scranton, Pennsylvania

See also
 Scranton High School (disambiguation)